36 Signal Regiment may refer to:
36 (Eastern) Signal Regiment, of the British Territorial Army
36 Signal Regiment (Canada), of the Canadian Forces Primary Reserve